Deraz Geri (also Romanized as Deraz Gerī; also known as Daraz Keri, Darzeh Kerī, and Derāz Kerī) is a village in Chubar Rural District, Haviq District, Talesh County, Gilan Province, Iran. At the 2006 census, its population was 292, in 66 families.

References 

Populated places in Talesh County